Schistura pridii is a species of ray-finned fish, a stone loach, in the genus Schistura. It is found in the upper Chao Phraya basin, in streams in the Doi Chiang Dao Wildlife Sanctuary, Chiang Mai Province in Thailand. Here it inhabits torrents, with rocky gravel and pebble substrates in which it often hides.

Named in honor of Pridi Banomyong, statesman and former Prime Minister of Thailand.

In the year 2018,  this species can be successfully bred by the Department of Fisheries of Thailand, after a 12-year experiment, but the yields were low.

References

P
Taxa named by Chavalit Vidthayanon
Fish described in 2003